If We Put Our Heads Together is the third and final collaborative studio album by American country music artists Ernest Tubb and Loretta Lynn. It was released on June 9, 1969, by Decca Records.

Critical reception

The review published in the June 21, 1969 issue of Billboard said, "This is must merchandise for the dealer. Devotees of country music will find it very difficult to lay this package down inasmuch as the combined sales power of Ernest Tubb and Loretta Lynn is tremendous. They do some great duets, including the hit single, "Who's Gonna Take the Garbage Out" and "Let's Wait a Little Longer", "That Odd Couple" and others."

Cashbox published a review in the June 28 issue which said, "The dynamic duo of Ernest Tubb and
Loretta Lynn return for their third LP which spotlights the twosome performing their latest chart rising single in addition to other fine ballad and up tempo delights. Included, besides the title track, are "Who's Gonna Take the Garbage Out?", "Holding on to Nothing", "Chased You Till You Caught Me", "Let the World Keep on a Turnin'", "That Odd Couple" and five more. Fine set."

Commercial performance 
The album peaked on the US Billboard Hot Country LP's chart at No. 19.

The first single from the album, "Who's Gonna Take the Garbage Out?", was released in May 1969 and peaked at No. 18 on the US Billboard Hot Country Singles chart. The second single, "If We Put Our Heads Together (Our Hearts Will Tell Us What to Do)", was released in September 1969 and did not chart.

Recording
Recording of the album took place over three sessions at Bradley's Barn in Mount Juliet, Tennessee, beginning on February 18, 1969. Two additional sessions followed on March 11 and April 1.

Track listing

Personnel
Adapted from the album liner notes and Decca recording session records.
Harold Bradley – drums
Owen Bradley – producer
Steve Chapman – guitar
Buddy Charleton – steel guitar
Floyd Cramer – piano
Erroll Jernigan – fiddle
Loretta Lynn – lead vocals
Billy Parker – guitar
Hargus Robbins – piano
Noel Stanley – bass
Ernest Tubb – lead vocals
James Wilkerson – drums

Charts
Album

Singles

References 

1969 albums
Vocal duet albums
Loretta Lynn albums
Albums produced by Owen Bradley
Ernest Tubb albums
Decca Records albums